Alburnus vistonicus is a species of ray-finned fish in the genus Alburnus that is endemic to the Lake Vistonida drainage in Greece.

References

External links
 

vistonicus
Fish described in 2007
Taxa named by Jörg Freyhof
Endemic fauna of Greece